HMS Tornado was a Royal Navy R-class destroyer constructed and then operational in the First World War. She was sunk, with most of her crew in 1917.

Construction
Tornado was ordered from Alexander Stephen and Sons by the British Admiralty in March 1916 as part of the Eighth War Construction Programme.  The ship was launched at Stephen's Linthouse, Clydeside shipyard on 4 August 1917 and completed in November 1917.

Armament consisted of three QF 4in Mk IV guns on the ship's centreline, with one on the forecastle, one aft on a raised bandstand and one between the second and third funnels. A single 2-pounder (40 mm) pom-pom anti-aircraft gun was fitted, while torpedo armament consisted of four 21 inch (533 mm) torpedoes in two twin mounts. The ship had a complement of 82 officers and men.

Service
On commissioning, Tornado joined the 10th Destroyer Flotilla of the Harwich Force. One of the duties of the Harwich Force destroyers was the so-called "Beef Run", convoys to and from The Netherlands. Tornado was part of the escort of a Netherlands-bound convoy on 22 December, when the destroyer  struck a mine and was badly damaged, having to be towed to Harwich by the destroyer . The remainder of the convoy reached the Hook of Holland safely, and the escort waited near the Maas Light Buoy for the return convoy. At about 02:00 hr on 23 December, Tornado,  and  ran into a German minefield, with Torrent striking a German mine. Surprise and Tornado went to rescue Torrents crew, but Torrent struck a second mine and quickly sank. Tornado struck two mines and sunk while trying to rejoin Radiant, which was standing off protecting the rescue efforts from any interference from German U-boats, while Surprise also struck a mine and sunk. Only Radiant remained afloat and undamaged and picked up the survivors from the three ships. Only two survivors were picked up from Tornado with 75 killed. In total, 12 officers and 240 other ranks were killed from the three ships.

Notes

Citations

Bibliography
 

 

 

World War I destroyers of the United Kingdom
R-class destroyers (1916)
1917 ships